Armageddon, in comics, may refer to:

 Armageddon 2001, a 1991 DC Comics storyline 
 Armageddon (Chaos! Comics), a Lady Death and Evil Ernie crossover
 Armageddon (underground comic), an underground comic by Barney Steel
 Wildstorm: Armageddon, a 2008 Wildstorm storyline

See also
Armageddon (disambiguation)